Fernald is an unincorporated community in Richland Township, Story County, Iowa, United States.

References

Unincorporated communities in Story County, Iowa
Unincorporated communities in Iowa